Dolores is the sixth album by the jazz/ambient band Bohren & der Club of Gore.

Track listing

Personnel

Band members
Thorsten Benning – drums
Christoph Clöser – Fender Rhodes, vibraphone, tenor- and baritone saxophone, recording and engineering
Morten Gass – bass, organ, vocoder, synthesizer, recording and engineering
Robin Rodenberg – bass

Other personnel
Jorg Föllert – artwork and typography
Melanie Höner – artwork and drawing
Marcus Schmickler – mixing and mastering

References

2008 albums
Bohren & der Club of Gore albums
Ipecac Recordings albums
PIAS Recordings albums